Copake is a hamlet and census-designated place (CDP) in Columbia County, New York, United States. The hamlet is in the south-central part of the town of Copake. The CDP was designated after the 2010 census, so no population figure is yet available.

The area was once known as Copake Flats.

The Copake Memorial Clock was added to the National Register of Historic Places in 2012.

Geography
Copake is located in a flat valley along Bashbish Brook at the western foot of the Taconic Mountains, a range that runs along the New York-Massachusetts border.

Demographics

References

Census-designated places in New York (state)
Census-designated places in Columbia County, New York
Hamlets in New York (state)
Hamlets in Columbia County, New York